Bhale Kodallu is a 1968 Telugu-language comedy film written and directed by K. Balachander. It was simultaneously filmed in Tamil as Bama Vijayam, despite being released more than a year after that. The film features an ensemble cast consisting of S. V. Ranga Rao, Sowcar Janaki, Kanchana, Jayanthi, Nagabhushanam, Ramakrishna, Chalam, Rajasree and Saraswathi.

Plot 
A movie star moves into the neighbourhood where a joint family of three husbands and their wives live. Her presence sends the wives into a spending spree as they buy radios and fancy goods to keep up with their glamorous neighbour, while accusing their husbands of being too close to the star.

Cast 
Credits adapted from Chitra Seema:
 S. V. Ranga Rao as Narasimham
 Sowcar Janaki as Parvathi
 Kanchana as Seetha
 Jayanthi as Rukmini
 Nagabhushanam as Shankaram
 Ramakrishna as Ramam
 Chalam as Krishna
 Rajasree as the movie star
 Saraswathi as Sacchu

Production 
In 1965, when K. Balachander was "just getting his bearings in the film industry", his household was excited because Sowcar Janaki, a star, was due to visit their house. This incident laid the foundation for  Bhale Kodallu, which was written and directed by Balachander, and produced by S. S. Vasan under Gemini Studios. It was simultaneously filmed in Tamil as Bama Vijayam, with a slightly different cast.

Soundtrack 
The soundtrack was composed by M. S. Viswanathan, while the lyrics were written by C. Narayana Reddy.

Release 
Bhale Kodallu was released on 26 April 1968, over a year after Bama Vijayam (24 February 1967).

References

Bibliography

External links 
 

1960s Telugu-language films
1968 comedy films
1968 films
Films directed by K. Balachander
Films scored by M. S. Viswanathan
Indian comedy films